Bethany is an unincorporated community in Washington Township, Parke County, in the U.S. state of Indiana.

History
A post office was established at Bethany in 1852, and remained in operation until 1873. The community's name commemorates the biblical place Bethany.

Geography

References

Unincorporated communities in Indiana
Unincorporated communities in Parke County, Indiana